K34QB-D, virtual channel 45 (UHF digital channel 34), branded on-air as TV8, is a low-powered television station licensed to Vail, Colorado, United States. Founded on September 17, 1992, the station is owned by Deerfield Media. The station can be seen throughout the Vail area on cable channel 8. TV8 Summit covering Breckenridge Resort, Keystone Resort, and the greater Summit County.

Operations of TV8 were shuttered on July 17, 2020, due to the impact on tourism caused by the COVID-19 pandemic. The transmitter had been silent since 2019 due to transmitter failure ahead of the move of the station from channel 45 to channel 34 due to the repack. The station was quietly acquired from Vail Resorts by Deerfield Media at some point.

See also
K36DB-CD

References

External links 
TV8 & 17 official site
TV8 & 17 official site
 

34QB-D
Television channels and stations established in 1992
1992 establishments in Colorado
Low-power television stations in the United States